Davide Biraschi (born 2 July 1994) is an Italian professional footballer who plays as a defender for Süper Lig club Fatih Karagümrük, on loan from Genoa.

Club career
On 17 January 2022, Biraschi joined Fatih Karagümrük in Turkey on loan (renews).

Personal life
On 2 October 2020, Biraschi tested positive for COVID-19.

References

External links

1994 births
Footballers from Rome
Living people
Association football defenders
Italian footballers
Italy under-21 international footballers
U.S. Avellino 1912 players
F.C. Grosseto S.S.D. players
Genoa C.F.C. players
Fatih Karagümrük S.K. footballers
Serie A players
Serie B players
Serie C players
Süper Lig players
Italian expatriate footballers
Expatriate footballers in Turkey
Italian expatriate sportspeople in Turkey